The 2006–07 Washington Capitals season was the Washington Capitals' 33rd season in the National Hockey League (NHL), and the last one in which they used their blue, black and bronze color scheme.

Regular season
 December 15, 2006 - Ovechkin gets the second hat trick of his career by scoring all three goals of a 3–2 overtime victory against the Atlanta Thrashers. The third goal is scored just six seconds into overtime, tying Mats Sundin and David Legwand for the fastest regular-season overtime goal ever scored.

Season standings

Schedule and results

October

November

December

January

February

March

April

 Green background indicates win.     
 Red background indicates regulation loss.   
 White background indicates overtime/shootout loss.

Playoffs 
For the third consecutive season, the Capitals failed to qualify for the playoffs.

Player statistics

Transactions

Trades

Free agents acquired

Free agents lost

Draft picks
Washington's picks at the 2006 NHL Entry Draft in Vancouver, British Columbia.

See also
 2006–07 NHL season

References

 Game log: Washington Capitals game log on espn.com
 Team standings: NHL standings on espn.com
 Player Stats: Washington Capitals 2006-07 Reg. Season Stats on espn.com
 Draft picks: 2006 NHL Entry Draft

External links
 Official site of the Washington Capitals

Wash
Wash
Washington Capitals seasons
Cap
Cap